Zibiah, or Sibia, (Ṣīḇəyā, "gazelle") was the consort of King Ahaziah of Judah, and the mother of King Jehoash of Judah. She was from Beersheba. She is mentioned only in 2 Kings 12:1 and 2 Chronicles 24:1, both references to her son's accession. The biblical references give no information about her other than her association with Beersheba and Joash.

The fact that she was from Beersheba indicates a southern strategy by the king of Judah, trying to consolidate the control of the area. 

Zibiah is also a Hebrew given name (compare Aramaic, "Tabitha").

References

Queen mothers
Women in the Hebrew Bible
Hebrew feminine given names
Jewish royalty